On December 5, 1921, a head-on collision occurred on a single line of track near Bryn Athyn station in Pennsylvania, United States. The collision resulted in a fire and claimed 27 lives while injuring 70 others.

Background
The railway was a single track coordinated by time-tables and train orders. Before leaving the station, the engineers would be given written orders in regards to the expected rail traffic. The first train, No. 151, consisted of a locomotive, a combine car, and two passenger cars. It had departed from Philadelphia traveling northeast. On this same route was Train No. 154, a milk train, that was running late. Train 151 had pulled into a siding to allow No. 154 to pass. The engineer had been given written orders to wait for No. 154, but to also wait for Train No. 156, another passenger that would be traveling this railway. However, the conductor of Train 151 overlooked these orders and proceeded after No .154 had passed, despite the block signal being down, meaning the train was supposed to remain stopped.

Accident
At 7:55 am, Trains 151 and 156 collided about half a mile from the Bryn Athyn station. The result of the collision spilled hot coals onto the wooden floors of the cars and resulted in a fire. In total 27 persons were killed in the wreck, including the firemen of the two trains. The conductor and engineer on both train survived the accident, those of which who served on train No. 151 served time in prison for the accident.

A 2020 video The Bryn Athyn Train Wreck of 1921, by Tom Lynskey, has a clear explanation of the cause and results of the train wreck.

References

Railway accidents in 1921
Railway accidents and incidents in Pennsylvania